Myrtle Hall Farm, also known as Meadow Farm, is a historic plantation house and farm located near Bluemont, Loudoun County, Virginia.  The original section of the house was built about 1813, and consists of a two-story, brick main block with a smaller two-story service wing and single story kitchen addition. A two-story library addition was built in about 1850. The house is in the Federal style.  Also on the property are the contributing stone springhouse (c.1813), The Mordecai Throckmorton Family Cemetery, wood shed (c. 1850), stone-lined well (c. 1813), tenant house (1949), two-story guest house (1930, 1949), tennis court (c. 1949), and stone entry (c. 1949).

It was listed on the National Register of Historic Places in 2006.

References

Plantation houses in Virginia
Houses on the National Register of Historic Places in Virginia
Farms on the National Register of Historic Places in Virginia
Federal architecture in Virginia
Houses completed in 1813
Houses in Loudoun County, Virginia
National Register of Historic Places in Loudoun County, Virginia